Châbons is a commune in the Isère department in southeastern France.

Geography
The Bourbre forms part of the commune's southeastern border and then flows north through the eastern part of the commune.

Population

See also
Communes of the Isère department

References

Communes of Isère